Strumaria hardyana is a species of plant that is endemic to Namibia. Its natural habitats are subtropical or tropical dry shrubland and rocky areas. It is one of the three species of Strumaria with nodding rather than outward-facing flowers. It can be distinguished from the similar species Strumaria truncata by the narrow membranous margin to the leaves, which are not twisted.

References

Flora of Namibia
hardyana
Least concern plants
Plants described in 1985
Taxonomy articles created by Polbot